Ethmia fritillella is a moth in the family Depressariidae. It is found in Brazil.

The ground color of the forewings is brown, reflecting shining purplish and extensively marked with shining white. The ground color of the hindwings is white at the base and pale brownish beyond, becoming dark brown in the apical area.

References

Moths described in 1973
fritillella